Events from the year 1979 in the United Kingdom.

Incumbents
 Monarch – Elizabeth II
 Prime Minister - James Callaghan (Labour) (until 4 May), Margaret Thatcher (Conservative) (starting 4 May)
 Parliament
 47th (until 7 April)
 48th (starting 9 May)

Events

January
 1 January – French carmaker Peugeot completes its takeover of the European division of financially troubled American carmaker Chrysler, which was agreed last year and includes the British operations of the former Rootes Group. 
 5 January – Lorry drivers go on strike, causing new shortages of heating oil and fresh food.
 10 January – Prime Minister James Callaghan returns from an international summit to a Britain in a state of industrial unrest. The Sun newspaper reports his comments with a famous headline: "Crisis? What Crisis?"
 15 January – Rail workers begin a 24-hour strike.
 22 January – Tens of thousands of public-workers strike in the beginning of what becomes known as the "Winter of Discontent".

February
 1 February – Grave-diggers call off a strike in Liverpool which has delayed dozens of burials.
 2 February – Sid Vicious, the former Sex Pistols guitarist, is found dead in New York after apparently suffocating on his own vomit as a result of a heroin overdose. 21-year-old London-born Vicious (real name John Simon Ritchie) is on bail for the second degree murder of his girlfriend Nancy Spungen, who was found stabbed to death in a hotel room on 12 October last year.
 9 February – Trevor Francis signs for Nottingham Forest in British football's first £1 million deal.
 12 February – Over 1,000 schools close due to the heating oil shortage caused by the lorry drivers' strike.
 14 February – "Saint Valentine's Day Concordat" between Trades Union Congress and Government, The Economy, the Government, and Trade Union Responsibilities, marks an end to the "Winter of Discontent".
 15 February – Opinion polls show the Conservatives up to 20 points ahead of Labour, whose popularity has slumped due to the Winter of Discontent.
 22 February – Saint Lucia becomes independent of the United Kingdom.
 26 February – Death of the last Muggletonian.

March
 1 March
 Scottish devolution referendum: Scotland votes by a majority of 77,437 for a Scottish Assembly, which is not implemented due to a condition that at least 40% of the electorate must support the proposal.
 Welsh devolution referendum: Wales votes against devolution.
 Conservative candidate David Waddington retains the seat for his party in the Clitheroe by-election.
 National Health Service workers in the West Midlands threaten to go on strike in their bid to win a nine per cent pay rise.
 17 March – Nottingham Forest beat Southampton 3–2 at Wembley Stadium to win the Football League Cup for the second year running.
 18 March – An explosion at the Golborne colliery in Golborne, Greater Manchester, kills three men.
 22 March – Sir Richard Sykes, ambassador to the Netherlands, is shot dead by a Provisional Irish Republican Army member in The Hague.
 28 March – James Callaghan's government loses a motion of confidence by one vote, forcing a General Election.
 29 March – James Callaghan announces that the General Election will be held on 3 May. All of the major opinion polls point towards a Conservative win which would make Margaret Thatcher the first female Prime Minister of Britain.
 30 March – Airey Neave, World War Two veteran and Conservative Northern Ireland spokesman, is killed by an Irish National Liberation Army bomb in the House of Commons car park.
 31 March – The Royal Navy withdraws from Malta as ordered by Maltese President Anton Buttigieg.

April
 April – Statistics show that the economy shrank by 0.8% in the first quarter of the year, largely due to the Winter of Discontent, sparking fears that Britain could soon be faced with its second recession in four years. 
 4 April – Josephine Whitaker, a 19-year-old bank worker, is murdered in Halifax; police believe that she is the 11th woman to be murdered by the Yorkshire Ripper.
 7 April – The last RT type buses run in London, on route 62.
 23 April – Anti-Nazi League protester Blair Peach is fatally injured after being struck on the head probably by a member of the Metropolitan Police's Special Patrol Group.

May
 1 May – The London Underground Jubilee line is inaugurated by the Prince of Wales (Charles III).
 3 May – 1979 general election.
 4 May – The Conservatives win the General Election by a 44-seat majority and Margaret Thatcher becomes the first female Prime Minister of the United Kingdom. Liberal Party leader Jeremy Thorpe is the most notable MP to lose his seat in the election. Despite being 67 years old and having lost the first General Election he has contested, James Callaghan is expected to stay on as leader of a Labour Party now in opposition after five years in government. Among the new members of parliament is John Major, 36-year-old MP for Huntingdon.
 8 May – Former Liberal Party leader and MP Jeremy Thorpe goes on trial at the Old Bailey charged with attempted murder.
 9 May – Liverpool win the Football League First Division title for the 12th time.
 12 May – Arsenal defeat Manchester United 3–2 in the FA Cup final at Wembley Stadium, with Alan Sunderland scoring a last gasp winner in response to two United goals inside the last five minutes which had seen the scores level at 2–2.
 15 May – Government abolishes the Price Commission.
 21 May
 Elton John becomes the first musician from the west to perform live in the Soviet Union.
 Conservative MPs back Margaret Thatcher's proposals to sell off parts of nationalised industries. During the year, the Government will begin to sell its stake in British Petroleum.
 24 May – Thorpe Park at Chertsey in Surrey is opened; it becomes one of the top three most popular theme parks in the country.
 25 May – Price of milk increases more than 10% to 15 pence a pint.
 30 May – Nottingham Forest F.C. defeat Malmö FF, the Swedish football league champions, 1–0 in the European Cup final at Olympiastadion, Munich. The only goal of the game is scored by Trevor Francis.

June
 7 June – European Parliament election, the first direct election to the European Parliament; the turnout in Britain is low at 32%. The Conservatives have the most MEPs at 60, while Labour only have 17. The Liberals gain a 12.6% share of the vote but not a single MEP, while the Scottish National Party, Democratic Unionist Party, Social Democratic and Labour Party and Official Ulster Unionist Party all gain an MEP each.
 12 June – The new Conservative government's first budget sees chancellor Geoffrey Howe cut the standard tax rate by 3p and slashing the top rate from 83% to 60%.
 18 June – Neil Kinnock, 37-year-old Labour MP for Islwyn in South Wales, becomes shadow education spokesman.
 22 June – Former Liberal Party leader Jeremy Thorpe is cleared in court of the allegations of attempted murder which have ruined his career.
 26 June – The eleventh James Bond film – Moonraker – is released in UK cinemas. It is the fourth of seven films to star Roger Moore as James Bond.

July
 5 July – The Queen attends the millennium celebrations of the Isle of Man's Parliament, Tynwald.
 12 July – Kiribati (formerly Gilbert Islands) becomes independent of the United Kingdom.
 17 July – Athlete Sebastian Coe sets a record time for running a mile, completing it in 3 minutes 48.95 seconds, in Oslo.
 23 July – The government announces £4 billion worth of public spending cuts.
 26 July – Education Act repeals the 1976 Act, allowing local education authorities to retain selective secondary schools.

August
 1 August – Following the recent takeover of Chrysler's European division by French carmaker Peugeot, the historic Talbot marque is revived for the range of cars previously sold in Britain as Chryslers, also taking over from the Simca brand in France.
 9 August – A naturist beach is established in Brighton.
 10 August–23 October – The entire ITV network in the UK is shut down by a technicians' strike (Channel Television remains unaffected). 
 14 August
 A storm in the Irish Sea hits the Fastnet yacht race. Fifteen lives and dozens of yachts are lost.
 Disgraced ex-MP John Stonehouse is released from jail after serving four years of his seven-year sentence for faking his own death.
 24 August – The Ford Cortina, Britain's best selling car, enters its fifth generation when a restyled version of the 1976 model is launched.
 27 August
 Lord Mountbatten of Burma and two 15-year-olds, his nephew and a boatboy, are assassinated by a Provisional Irish Republican Army bomb while holidaying in the Republic of Ireland, the Dowager Lady Brabourne dying the following day in hospital of injuries received. Lord Mountbatten was a retired fleet admiral, statesman, cousin to Elizabeth II and an uncle of Prince Philip, Duke of Edinburgh.
 Warrenpoint ambush: eighteen British soldiers killed in Northern Ireland by IRA bombs.
 30 August – Two men are arrested in Dublin and charged with the murder of Lord Mountbatten and the three other victims of the bombing.

September
 2 September – Police discover a woman's body in an alleyway near Bradford city centre. The woman, 20-year-old student Barbara Leach, is believed to be the 12th victim of the mysterious Yorkshire Ripper mass murderer.
 5 September
 The Queen leads the mourning at the funeral of Lord Mountbatten of Burma.
 Manchester City F.C. pay a British club record fee of £1,450,000 for Wolverhampton Wanderers midfielder Steve Daley.
 8 September – Wolverhampton Wanderers set a new national transfer record by paying just under £1,500,000 for Aston Villa and Scotland striker Andy Gray.
 10 September – British Leyland announces that production of MG Cars will finish in the autumn of next year, in a move which will see the Abingdon plant closed.
 14 September – The government announces plans to regenerate the London Docklands with housing and commercial developments.
 21 September – A Royal Air Force Harrier jet crashes into a house in Wisbech, Cambridgeshire killing two men and a boy.
 25 September – Margaret Thatcher opens the new Central Milton Keynes shopping centre, the largest indoor shopping centre in Britain, after its final phase is completed six years after development of the huge complex first began.

October
 October – Statistics show a 2.3% contraction in the economy for the third quarter of the year, sparking fresh fears of another recession.
 11 October – Godfrey Hounsfield wins the Nobel Prize in Physiology or Medicine jointly with Allan McLeod Cormack "for the development of computer assisted tomography".
 23 October – All remaining foreign exchange controls abolished.
 27 October – Saint Vincent and the Grenadines gains independence.
 28 October – Chairman Hua Guofeng becomes the first Chinese leader to visit Britain.
 30 October – Martin Webster of the National Front is found guilty of inciting racial hatred.

November
 November – British Leyland chief executive Michael Edwardes wins the overwhelming backing of more than 100,000 of the carmaker's employees for his restructuring plans, which over the next few years will result in the closure of several plants and the loss of some 25,000 jobs.
 1 November – The government announces £3.5 billion in public spending cuts and an increase in prescription charges.
 5 November – The two men accused of murdering Lord Mountbatten and three others go on trial in Dublin.
 9 November – Four men are found guilty over the killing of paperboy Carl Bridgewater, who was shot dead at a farmhouse in the Staffordshire countryside 14 months ago. James Robinson and Vincent Hickey receive life sentences with a recommended minimum of 25 years for murder, 18-year-old Michael Hickey (also guilty of murder) receives an indefinite custodial sentence, while Patrick Molloy is guilty of manslaughter and jailed for 12 years.
 11 November – Last episode of the first series of the sitcom To the Manor Born on BBC One receives 23.95 million viewers, the all-time highest figure for a recorded programme in the UK.
 13 November
 The Times is published for the first time in nearly a year after a dispute between management and unions over staffing levels and new technology.
 Miners reject a 20% pay increase and threaten to go on strike until they get their desired pay rise of 65%.
 14 November – Vauxhall launches its first-ever front-wheel drive car – the Astra range of hatchbacks and estates – To compete in the growing family hatchback sector. It replaces the traditional rear-wheel drive Viva saloon, which had been produced in three incarnations since 1963. Initial production of the Astra will take place at the Opel factory in West Germany, with production set to be transferred to Britain by 1981.
 15 November
 Minimum Lending Rate reaches an all-time high of 17%.
 Art historian and former Surveyor of the Queen's Pictures Anthony Blunt's role as the "fourth man" of the 'Cambridge Five' double agents for the Soviet NKVD during World War II is revealed by Prime Minister Margaret Thatcher in the House of Commons; she gives further details on 21 November.
 21 November – Six months after winning the general election, the Conservatives are five points behind Labour (who have a 45% share of the vote) in an MORI opinion poll.
 23 November – In Dublin, Ireland, Irish Republican Army member Thomas McMahon is sentenced to life in prison for the assassination of Lord Mountbatten.

December
 4 December – The Hastie Fire in Hull leads to the deaths of 3 boys and begins the hunt for Bruce George Peter Lee, the UK's most prolific killer.
 7 December – Lord Soames appointed as the transitional governor of Rhodesia to oversee its move to independence.
 10 December
 William Arthur Lewis wins the Nobel Prize in Economics with Theodore Schultz "for their pioneering research into economic development research with particular consideration of the problems of developing countries".
 Stunt performer Eddie Kidd performs an 80 ft jump on a motorcycle.
 14 December
 Doubts are raised over the convictions of the four men in the Carl Bridgewater case after Hubert Vincent Spencer is charged with murdering 70-year-old farmer Hubert Wilkes at a farmhouse less than half a mile away from the one where Carl Bridgewater was murdered.
 The Clash release post-punk album London Calling.
 20 December – The government publishes the Housing Bill which will give council house tenants the right to buy their homes from the following year. More than 5 million households in the United Kingdom currently occupy council houses.
 21 December – Lancaster House Agreement, an independent agreement for Rhodesia is signed in London.

Undated
 Inflation rises to 13.4%.
 The largest number of working days lost through strike action since 1926.
 Dame Josephine Barnes becomes first woman president of the British Medical Association.
 The first J D Wetherspoon pub is established by Tim Martin in the London Borough of Haringey.
 Scottish Gaelic service Radio nan Eilean established in Stornoway.
 New plant species, Senecio eboracensis, the York groundsel, is discovered.
 Common crane returns to The Broads.
 A record of more than 1.7 million new cars are sold in the United Kingdom this year, with the best selling car, the Ford Cortina, selling more than 190,000 units. Ford Motor Company enjoys the largest share of the new car market, following in second place by British Leyland, the former Chrysler Europe brands (now owned by Peugeot) in third place, and Vauxhall in fourth place. Foreign brands including Datsun, Renault and Volkswagen also prove popular.

Publications
 Douglas Adams' novel The Hitchhiker's Guide to the Galaxy.
 J. G. Ballard's novel The Unlimited Dream Company.
 Angela Carter's short stories The Bloody Chamber.
 Penelope Fitzgerald's novel Offshore.
 William Golding's novel Darkness Visible.
 V. S. Naipaul's novel A Bend in the River.
 27 October – First issue (dated December 1979) of Viz comic published in Newcastle upon Tyne.

Births
 20 January – Will Young, singer, winner of Pop Idol (series 1)
 21 January – Johann Hari, disgraced journalist whose Orwell Prize is revoked following charges of plagiarism
 13 February – Rachel Reeves, economist and politician
 2 March – Jocelyn Jee Esien, comedian and actress
 12 March – Pete Doherty, rock musician (The Libertines and Babyshambles)
 9 April – Ben Silverstone, actor
 10 April – Sophie Ellis-Bextor, pop singer
 14 April – Iain Balshaw, English rugby player
 21 April – James McAvoy, Scottish actor
 12 May – Karin Szymko, gymnast
 12 May – Robert Key, cricketer and sportscaster
 15 May – Rachel Walker, field hockey player
 25 May – Jonny Wilkinson, rugby union player
 12 June
 Ellen Falkner, lawn bowler
 Jamie Harding, actor
 19 June – Graeme Ballard, Paralympic sprinter
 29 June – Abs Breen, English singer (5ive)
 13 July – Craig Bellamy, football player and manager
 25 July – Ali Carter, snooker player
 26 July – Johnson Beharry, VC, Grenadan-born war hero
 30 July – Graeme McDowell, golfer
 5 August – David Healy, footballer
 9 August – Lisa Nandy, politician
 20 August – Jamie Cullum, singer
 23 August – Ritchie Neville, English singer (5ive)
 14 September – Stuart Fielden, rugby league player
 15 September – Paul Rudd, disc jockey and songwriter
 22 September – Rebecca Long-Bailey, politician
 28 September – Annika Reeder, gymnast
 4 October – Stefan Booth, actor
 12 October – Steve Borthwick, rugby union player and coach
 8 November – Aaron Hughes, footballer
 9 November –  Caroline Flack, television presenter and actress (died 2020)
 22 November – Scott Robinson, English pop singer (5ive)
 29 November – Simon Amstell, comedian and television presenter
 1 December – Lisa Wooding, field-hockey player
 3 December – Daniel Bedingfield, pop singer and songwriter
 14 December – Michael Owen, footballer
 17 December – Charlotte Edwards, cricketer
 24 December – Lucilla Wright, field-hockey player
 25 December – Robert Huff, English racing driver

Deaths
 16 January – Peter Butterworth, actor and comedian (born 1919)
 23 January – Frank Owen, journalist and politician (born 1905)
 2 February – Sid Vicious (real name John Simon Ritchie), musician (Sex Pistols) (drug overdose in the United States) (born 1957)
 14 February – Reginald Maudling, politician (born 1917)
 19 February – Wee Georgie Wood, actor and comedian (born 1895)
 19 March – Richard Beckinsale, actor (born 1947)
 23 March – Ted Anderson, footballer (born 1911)
 24 March – Sir Jack Cohen, founder of the Tesco retail chain (born 1898)
 30 March – Airey Neave, politician (assassinated) (born 1916)
 11 May – Bernard Kettlewell, geneticist and lepidopterist (born 1907)
 8 June – Norman Hartnell, fashion designer (born 1901)
 12 July – Olive Morris, social activist (born 1952 in Jamaica)
 16 July – Alfred Deller, countertenor (born 1912) 
 8 August – Nicholas Monsarrat, novelist (born 1910)
 9 August – Cecil Jackson-Cole, humanitarian (born 1901)
 11 August – J. G. Farrell, novelist (born 1935)
 23 August – Richard Hearne ("Mr Pastry"), comic performer (born 1908)
 27 August – Louis Mountbatten, 1st Earl Mountbatten of Burma, last Viceroy of India (victim of IRA bombing) (born 1900)
 28 August – Doreen Knatchbull, Baroness Brabourne, aristocrat and socialite (victim of IRA bombing) (born 1896)
 29 August – Ivon Hitchens, painter (born 1893) 
 27 September
 Gracie Fields, singer and comedian (born 1898)
 Jimmy McCulloch, rock singer-songwriter and guitarist (born 1953)
 10 October – Dr Christopher Evans, psychologist and computer scientist (born 1931)
 13 October – Rebecca Helferich Clarke, composer and violist (born 1886)
 15 October – Leslie Grade, theatrical talent agent (born 1916)
 30 October – Sir Barnes Wallis, aeronautical engineer (born 1887)
 8 November – Edward Ardizzone, painter, printmaker and author (born 1900)
 23 November – Merle Oberon, actress (born 1911)
 30 November – Joyce Grenfell, actress, comedian and singer-songwriter (born 1910)
 9 December – Jack Solomons, boxing promoter (born 1902)

See also
 List of British films of 1979

References

 
Years of the 20th century in the United Kingdom
United Kingdom